Gotham City is a themed land at Warner Bros. World Abu Dhabi, as well as various Six Flags parks.  The area is inspired by the dirty industrial city portrayed in Batman comics, and hosts attractions themed to this concept, including Batman's Night Flight, and The Joker Funhouse. Gotham City features dark imposing warehouses, and faux crumbing amusement park rides.

During the grand opening ceremony on July 26, 2018, the park was inaugurated by Vice President and Prime Minister of the UAE and Ruler of Dubai His Highness Sheikh Mohammed bin Rashid Al Maktoum, and Crown Prince of Abu Dhabi and Deputy Supreme Commander of the UAE Armed Forces His Highness Sheikh Mohammed bin Zayed Al Nahyan in the Warner Bros. Plaza.

Warner Bros. Movie World - Germany
Inspired by Gotham City from DC Comics, the themed land was designed to feel like guests were stepping though the pages of a comic book onto the dirty crime-ridden streets of the infamous city. The land featured an attraction, Batman Adventure that allowed guests the opportunity to enter through Wayne Manor and explore the Batcave prior to helping Batman on one of his missions through Gotham City. The attraction was a clone of that at Movie World Australia.

Former attractions and entertainment
 Batman Adventure – The Ride
 Batman Thrills Spectacular
 Riddler's Revenge

Former restaurants and refreshments
 Gotham City Ice Cream
 Gotham City Snacks

Former shops
 Batman Shop
 DC Comic Universe

Warner Bros. World - Abu Dhabi
When building the park, the creative team wanted to build something that had never been seen before. Since the park is entirely indoors the team was able to create a more intricate thematic experience for guests which better reflected the grittiness of Gotham City from the comics.

Attractions and entertainment
 Batman: Knight Flight
 The Riddler Revolution
 The Joker Funhouse
 Rogues Gallery Games

Restaurants and refreshments
 Hall of Doom
 Mr. Freeze Ice Scream Truck
 Gotham City's Finest

Shops
 Park Row Pawn Shop
 Monarch Theatre Gifts
 Cat's Eye Jewelry
 Harlequin Confections
 Cobblepot Formal Wear

References

External links

 
Warner Bros. World Abu Dhabi
Themed areas in Warner Bros. Parks and Resorts